Bila, or Forest Bira, is a Bantu language spoken in the Mambasa Territory of the Democratic Republic of Congo. It is also spoken by the Mbuti Pygmies who live in that area. Pygmy groups to the west include the Kango and Sua (Batchua). Other Mbuti speak Central Sudanic languages. The Kango and Sua speak distinct dialects (southern and northern), but not enough to impair mutual intelligibility with their farming Bila patrons.

Maho (2009) lists Ibutu (Mbuttu, D.313) as a distinct language.

Phonology

Consonants

Vowels

References

Serge BAHUCHET, 2006. "Languages of the African Rainforest « Pygmy » Hunter-Gatherers: Language Shifts without Cultural Admixture." In Historical linguistics and hunter-gatherers populations in global perspective. Leipzig.
Kutsch Lojenga, Constance. 2003. Bila (D32). In Nurse, Derek and Philippson, Gérard (eds.), The Bantu languages, 450-474. London & New York: Routledge.

Biran languages
African Pygmies
Languages of the Democratic Republic of the Congo